The arrondissement of Nogent-sur-Marne is an arrondissement of France in the Val-de-Marne departement in the Île-de-France region. It has 14 communes.

Composition

The communes of the arrondissement of Nogent-sur-Marne, and their INSEE codes, are:

 Bry-sur-Marne (94015)
 Champigny-sur-Marne (94017)
 Charenton-le-Pont (94018)
 Fontenay-sous-Bois (94033)
 Joinville-le-Pont (94042)
 Maisons-Alfort (94046)
 Nogent-sur-Marne (94052)
 Noiseau (94053)
 Ormesson-sur-Marne (94055)
 Le Perreux-sur-Marne (94058)
 Saint-Mandé (94067)
 Villiers-sur-Marne (94079)
 Vincennes (94080)

History

The arrondissement of Nogent-sur-Marne was created in 1966 as part of the department Seine. In 1968 it became part of the new department Val-de-Marne. On 25 February 2017, it lost 3 communes to and gained 2 communes from the arrondissement of Créteil.

As a result of the reorganisation of the cantons of France which came into effect in 2015, the borders of the cantons are no longer related to the borders of the arrondissements. The cantons of the arrondissement of Nogent-sur-Marne were, as of January 2015:

 Bry-sur-Marne
 Champigny-sur-Marne-Centre
 Champigny-sur-Marne-Est
 Champigny-sur-Marne-Ouest
 Chennevières-sur-Marne
 Fontenay-sous-Bois-Est
 Fontenay-sous-Bois-Ouest
 Joinville-le-Pont
 Nogent-sur-Marne
 Ormesson-sur-Marne
 Le Perreux-sur-Marne
 Saint-Mandé
 Villiers-sur-Marne
 Vincennes-Est
 Vincennes-Ouest

References

Nogent-sur-Marne